Ringing may mean:

Vibrations
 Ringing (signal), unwanted oscillation of a signal, leading to ringing artifacts
 Vibration of a harmonic oscillator
 Bell ringing
 Ringing (telephony), the sound of a telephone bell
 Ringing (medicine), a ringing sound in the ears

Other uses
 Bird ringing, using numbered small metal pr plastic leg rings to track birds
 Ringing (of vehicles), the illegal practice of stealing a vehicle and replacing its identification number with that of another vehicle of the same model which has been a write-off

See also

 Wringing (disambiguation)
 Ring (disambiguation)